Batac, officially the City of Batac, is a 5th class component city in the province of Ilocos Norte, Philippines. According to the 2020 census, it has a population of 55,484 people.

Etymology
The word Batac translates as "pull" in the Ilocano language. More loosely, it refers to "the people's pulling their efforts together."

Batac has an interesting colloquial origin of its name. According to a legend, set in pre-settlement Batac, a man fell into a deep hole while he was digging for the root crop "camangeg". He struggled to get out but could not despite his best efforts. He cried for help but nobody was around. He waited for hours and had given up hope of being saved. Two men from the neighboring town of Paoay happened to pass by. They heard the man shouting and traced it to where he was trapped. Upon seeing him, they heard the man said "Batakennak! Batakennak!" The two men did not understand until the man explained that he was saying, "Pull me up! Pull me up!" They did just that. When the two men reached their hometown, they told their story to their friends. Since then, the town has been called "Batac," which is derived from the word "batakennak."

History

Batac was founded by the Augustinians in 1587 under the patronage of the Immaculate Conception. It is the second oldest town established by the Augustinians in the province of Ilocos Norte. Hence, in 1987, Batac reached its fourth centennial.

Batac was officially organized into a ministry on January 5, 1586. The first priest assigned to cathecize the natives of the community was Esteban Marin, an Augustinian who probably arrived in Batac in 1585. Paoay and Dinglas (Dingras) were then the visitas of Batac.

Folk history states that there were two villages in Batac during the early part of tile foundation of the town, one was an Itneg community which occupied sitio Nangalisan and a Christian community occupying San José.

The first site of tile poblacion was in San José, which is now called Barangay Palpalicong. It is said that the ethnic minority groups of Bangui and Nueva Era are the pre-Spanish descendants of early inhabitants of Batac.

The Augustinians considered the people of Batac more civilized than the other tribes, because they were better than the other "Indios" in personal cleanliness.

Cityhood

Republic Act 9407, the law that converted the Municipality of Batac into a component city in the Province of Ilocos Norte, to be known as Batac City, was overwhelmingly ratified by the people in a plebiscite conducted on June 23, 2007.

The Supreme Court declared the cityhood law of Batac and 15 other cities unconstitutional after a petition filed by the League of Cities of the Philippines in its ruling on November 18, 2008. On December 22, 2009, the cityhood law of Batac and 15 other municipalities regain its status as cities again after the court reversed its ruling on November 18, 2008. On August 23, 2010, the court reinstated its ruling on November 18, 2008, causing Batac and 15 cities to become regular municipalities. Finally, on February 15, 2011, Batac becomes a city again including the 15 municipalities declaring that the conversion to cityhood met all legal requirements.

After six years of legal battle, in its board resolution, the League of Cities of the Philippines acknowledged and recognized the cityhood of Batac and 15 other cities.

Geography
The municipalities of Banna, Currimao, Paoay, Pinili, Sarrat, Marcos and San Nicolas form its boundaries.

Barangays
Batac is politically subdivided into 43 barangays, 14 of which constitute the poblacion. These barangays are headed by elected officials: Barangay Captain, Barangay Council, whose members are called Barangay Councilors. All are elected every three years.

Climate

Demographics

Economy 

The Batac City Public Market touted as one of the biggest in the region offers a wide array of goods – freshly picked local vegetables and fruits, handicrafts, tincrafts, pottery, native delicacies, chicharon, longganisa, wet market treats and many others. The Delicia Center, located adjacent to the City Public Market, contains RTW shops, banks, appliance stores, farm supplies, pharmacies, groceries, a lottery outlet and many more. The Delicia Center and the City Public Market form part of the commercial district of Batac City.

With the presence of the Central Bank of the Philippines Cash Unit in the Batac City Government Center, financial institutions continue to spawn – Philippine National Bank, RCBC, Metrobank, Land Bank, BPI, Bank of Commerce, BDO and other local banks. Proof that Batac is offering a good business climate to investors.

The Plaza Maestro Complex, one of the most modern shopping centers in the province caters to the needs of the new generation, offering two of the country's top fast food chains (Jollibee and Chowking), several boutique shops, a drugstore and a photo shop, among others. A stone's throw away from the commercial complex are bakeshops and a local pizza house.

Tourism

The Marcos Museum and Mausoleum is situated in the city center. The Mausoleum is where the glass-entombed, preserved corpse of Former President Ferdinand E. Marcos is found. The Museum holds the memorabilia of then President, from his stint in the Armed Forces down to his presidency. Other notable figures who hails from Batac include Gen. Artemio Ricarte, the Father of the Philippine Army and Msgr. Gregorio Aglipay, the co-founder of the Philippine Independent Church. Monuments and shrines of these personalities had been erected and named after them.

The Batac Riverside Empanadaan is a retail and dining center catering to tourist selling food products including the city's primary commodity of Batac, the empanada, and other souvenirs and products.

The city has two festivals, The Farmers Festival and The Empanada Festival. The Farmers' Festival, conducted in the first week of May each year is a celebration of bountiful harvest and a tribute to the farmers of the city. It is participated by the rural barangays of the city. The Empanada Festival is a festivity held on the June 23 in celebration of the city's Charter Day. The main feature of the festival is the street dancing which chronicles the process of preparing the empanada.

The Batac City Fiesta, a month-long festivity commencing on December 8, is the longest fiesta in the Province of Ilocos Norte. The fiesta is celebrated in honor of the city's patroness, Our Lady of the Immaculate Conception. The Electric and Lights Parade marks the beginning of the City Fiesta every December 8.

Government
Batac, belonging to the second congressional district of the province of Ilocos Norte, is governed by a mayor designated as its local chief executive and by a city council as its legislative body in accordance with the Local Government Code. The mayor, vice mayor, and the councilors are elected directly by the people through an election which is being held every three years.

Elected officials

List of local chief executives

Education
Batac National High School (BNHS) is the most popular high school in the city. It has three campuses: Poblacion, Bungon and Payao.

The Mariano Marcos State University (MMSU) is a comprehensive institution of higher learning in the Ilocos Region. MMSU's root anchored deep, its foundation is strong, and its beginnings all proven historical turning points as far back as the early 1900s.

The city has one Catholic School, The Immaculate Conception Academy. It was named after Immaculate Conception, the patron saint of the city. It is under the Missionary Sisters Servants of the Holy Spirit (SSpS). It was founded in 1963. It is located beside the Immaculate Conception Parish.

Notable people

References

External links

 
 [ Philippine Standard Geographic Code]
Philippine Census Information
Local Governance Performance Management System

 
Cities in Ilocos Norte
Populated places established in 1587
1587 establishments in the Philippines
Component cities in the Philippines